Paul Brooks (1909–1998) was a nature writer, book editor, and environmentalist.

Born in New York City, Paul Brooks received in 1931 his bachelor's degree from Harvard University, where he was the editor of the Harvard Lampoon. Soon after graduation, he became an employee at the publishing company Houghton Mifflin in Boston and remained with the company for 40 years. He was editor-in-chief of Houghton Mifflin's General Book Department from 1943 until his retirement in 1969. He wrote Two Park Street: A Publishing Memoir, containing anecdotes about his experiences editing the works of Rachel Carson, Roger Tory Peterson, Winston Churchill, Arthur Schlesinger Jr., and James Agee, among others. Paul Brooks suggested the title Silent Spring for Rachel Carson's famous book.

In addition to his career as an editor, Brooks was also a prolific author of books and articles. He won the 1965 John Burroughs Medal for his 1964 book Roadless Area.

Books

References

1909 births
1998 deaths
Harvard University alumni
American book editors
American non-fiction environmental writers
John Burroughs Medal recipients
American nature writers
American male non-fiction writers
The Harvard Lampoon alumni